Henryka Beyer (7 March 1782 – 24 October 1855) was a German painter active in Poland. She was the youngest sister of Wilhelm Henryk Minter, an architect.

Life and career
Born in Szczecin, Beyer was initially taught by local painter Petera Schmidta. In 1805 she moved to Berlin with her brother Charles Frederick and studied under the Director of the KPM (Königliche Porzellan-Manufaktur), Gottfried Wilhelm Volker.

In 1811 Beyer moved to Warsaw, where she was trained by Antoni Brodowski. In 1813 she married the director of the Warsaw lottery John Gottlieb Wilhelm Beyer (died 1819), moving from the Lutheran faith to Calvinism. They had three sons; the youngest, Charles Adolf, was born in 1818. Early widowed, Beyer had to maintain her sons and in 1824 in Warsaw opened a school of painting and drawing for women. She ran it until 1835. She painted still lifes, mostly watercolors, usually in dark warm colors. Beyer initialed her works HKA.

She died in 1855 in Chrzanów near Warsaw and is buried in the cemetery next to the children of Calvinist in Warsaw (q E, row 3, No. 13). The poet Stanisław Jachowicz honored her memory with the following lines for her obituary: Prosta jak kwiatek, co go malowała/W niebiańskie strojny klejnoty,/Prawda w jej słowie, a w czynach jej – chwała,/W życiu zachęta do cnoty (Simple as a flower, as it painted / W heavenly adorned with jewels, / The truth in her words and her actions - glory, / In the life of an incentive to virtue).

References

 Wladyslaw Janiszewski, in Polish Biographical Dictionary. T. 1 Kraków: Polish Academy of Learning - Main Ingredients in bookstores Gebethner and Wolff, 1935, p 478 Reprint: Department of National Theatre. Ossolińskich, Kraków 1989, 
 Hedwig and Eugene Szulcowie, Evangelical Reformed Cemetery in Warsaw, Warsaw, 1989

1782 births
1855 deaths
Artists from Szczecin
Polish women artists
19th-century German women artists
19th-century Polish painters
Expatriates from the Kingdom of Prussia in Congress Poland